Andy Crofts (born Andrew John Goncalves; 23 March 1977) is an English musician, singer-songwriter and photographer. He was the founding member of psychedelic indie rock band The Moons. Crofts is also a photographer and made a documentary film while touring called One and official music video These City Streets and She Moves With The Fayre for musician Paul Weller.

Crofts is a full-time musician for UK solo artist Paul Weller.

Early life
Crofts was an only child born in São Paulo, Brazil. His mother, Jeanne Crofts, was working as a dancer in São Paulo for a Circus known as Circo Tihany.

Around the age of 14 or 15, a friend of Andy's found an acoustic guitar in a skip, and they learned to play on it. This helped ignite Crofts' love for music and inspired him to start writing.

Career

The Moons 

As the group's main songwriter, Crofts is responsible for all of the songwriting and direction of The Moons studio albums: 2010's Life on Earth, 2012's Fables of History and 2014's Mindwaves'and 2020's critically acclaimed 'Pocket Melodies'.

Crofts  founded The Moons in 2006 after splitting from  The On Offs. A collection of songs had gathered that would become Moons songs. In 2008, Crofts took songs to The Lodge Recording Studio in Northampton and arranged to use the studio and pay weekly, since he didn't have funds. Crofts recorded five songs on which he played all instruments except drums. He named his time in the studio the Lunar sessions. These songs caught the attention of Mojo magazine and promoters. His original home demos were initially sent to Paul Weller later earning him a place in the PW band.

In 2010, The Moons released their debut album Life on Earth on Acid Jazz Records, containing 12 Crofts originals including re-worked versions from the Lunar sessions.

In 2014 Crofts wrote an album called Mindwaves that he produced at Black Barn Studios in Woking with help from The Moons drummer Ben Gordelier. Soon after, The Moons recorded a live album from Bush Hall London. The album was limited to 500 copies on vinyl and contained a selection of songs from all 3 studio albums.

Paul Weller 
Crofts joined Paul Weller's band in March 2008 and began touring to promote the 22 Dreams album. Crofts had initially met Paul when supporting him in the former band The On Offs in 2006.

Crofts started as keyboard player for Weller before moving to bass guitar. He is a regular on Weller's studio albums since his 2010 album Wake Up the Nation.

Crofts' studio efforts contain many instruments such as bass guitar, guitar, keyboards, synths and vocals. Crofts even wrote string arrangements despite his lack of classical training.

When Crofts joined the Weller band, he was originally the keyboard player. He currently plays bass guitar on all live shows.

Producer
Crofts mixes and produces songs for signed and unsigned bands, as well as his own music. He worked with Dutch artist Max Meser on an as yet unreleased album.

Personal life
He currently lives in Worthing, West Sussex with his partner and model Tara Griffin. The couple has two children 

He is featured in the Paul Weller music video These City Streets''.

References 

1977 births
English male singer-songwriters
English male musicians
Living people
21st-century English singers
21st-century British male singers